Born on February 8, 1951, in Ahirpada Mohalla of Khurja (Uttar Pradesh)Ashok Chakradhar is an Indian author, poet and former head of the department of Hindi at Jamia Millia Islamia (Central University). After serving for 29 years, he took voluntary retirement to focus on working towards the propagation and development of the Hindi language.  In 2007 he became the Hindi coordinator at the Institute of Life Long Learning (ILLL) at the University of Delhi and in 2009 was appointed as the vice-chairman of Hindi Academy, Government of Delhi and as the vice-chairman of the Kendriya Hindi Shikshan Mandal, Ministry of HRD, Government of India.
He is the son-in-law of Kaka Hathrasi

Career
Chakradhar is a retired professor of the Hindi Department at Jamia Millia Islamia University in Delhi. He has been actively associated with radio and television and has scripted a number of dramas, satires and poems for children. He has appeared in some television soaps, like "Chhoti Si Asha" with Sandhya Mridul on Sony TV, and has hosted the show Wah Wah!! for SAB TV. He has also acted in various television serials.

He took voluntary retirement from Jamia Milia Islamia in 2004.

Film script writing
He wrote story of Jamuna Kinare (1983), a Braj Bhasha-language feature film which made by his father-in-law Kaka Hathrasi under the banner of "Kaka Hathrasi Films Production" and produced, directed and music composed by his brother-in-law Laxminarayan Garg

Films : Written and Directed (a)Telefilms 'Gulaabri', 'Jeet Gee Chhanno', 'Master Deepchand', 'Hai Musaddi',  'Jhoome Baalaa Jhoome Baalee', 'Teen Nazaare', ‘Bitiya’  (b)Teleserials 'Bhor Tarang', 'Dhhaaee Aakhar', 'Buaa Bhateejee', 'Bol Basanto'  (c)Documentaries 'Pangu Giri Langhe', 'Goraa Hat Jaa', 'Saaksharataa Niketan', 'Vikaas Kee Lakeeren', 'Har Bachchaa Ho Kakshaa Paanch', ‘Us Or Hai Chhateraa’.

Published works

Drama
'Rang Jamaa Lo', 'Bitiyaa Kee Sisakee', 'Bandariyaa Chalee Sasuraal', ‘Jab Rahaa na koee Chaaraa’, ‘Jaane kyaa Tapake’.

Children's literature
'koel Kaa Sitaar',  'Snehaa Kaa Sapnaa', 'Heeron Kee Choree', 'Ek Bagiyaa Main'

Adult educational literature
'Naee Dagar', 'Apaahij Kaun', 'Hamane Muhim Chalaaee', 'Bhaee Bhaut Achchhe', 'Badal Jaayengee Rekhaa', 'Taaumra Kaa Aaraam', 'Gharhe Oopar Handiyaa' 'To Kyaa Hotaa Jee', 'Aise Hotee Hai Shaadee', 'Rotee Ye Dhartee Dekho', 'Kab Talak Sahtee Rahen', 'Apnaa Haq Apnee Zameen', 'Kahaanee Jo Aankhon Se Bahee', 'Aur Police Par Bhee', 'Mazdooree Kee Raah', 'Jugat Karo Jeene Kee', 'Aur Kitne Din', Novel Manautee

In other media
Chakradhar was a guest on 21 July 2019 episode of The Kapil Sharma Show along with Rahat Indori.

Awards

 2014: Padma Shri by Government of India for (Scriptwriting)

References

External links
 Official Site at Jamia Millia Islamia
 Personal website (Hindi)
 Various articles of Ashok Chakradhar at Shabdankan (Hindi)
 Poems of Ashok Chakradhar at Kavita Kosh (Hindi)

1951 births
Living people
Hindi-language writers
Hindi-language poets
People from Bulandshahr district
Academic staff of Jamia Millia Islamia
Indian humorists
Indian literary critics
Academic staff of Delhi University
Recipients of the Padma Shri in literature & education
20th-century Indian poets
Poets from Uttar Pradesh
Indian male poets
20th-century Indian male writers